Shanea Tonkin (born 28 April 1997) is a field hockey player from Australia, who plays as a forward.

Personal life
Shanea Tonkin was born and raised in Perth, Western Australia.

Career

Domestic leagues

AHL
Tonkin made her Australian Hockey League debut in 2016 for the NT Stingers.

In 2017 and 2018, Tonkin represented her home state as a member of the WA Diamonds.

Hockey One
Following the dissolution of the AHL and subsequent introduction of the Sultana Bran Hockey One League, Tonkin was named in the newly formed Perth Thundersticks team. She represented the team in the inaugural season of the league, scoring once in the team's fifth-place finish.

National teams

Under–21
In 2016, Tonkin made her debut for the Australia U–21 team at the Junior Oceania Cup in the Gold Coast.

Hockeyroos
After multiple years in the Australian development squad, Tonkin was named to the Hockeyroos squad for the first time in 2022.

References

External links
 
 
 

1997 births
Living people
Australian female field hockey players
Field hockey players at the 2022 Commonwealth Games
Female field hockey forwards
20th-century Australian women
21st-century Australian women
Commonwealth Games silver medallists for Australia
Commonwealth Games medallists in field hockey
Field hockey players from Perth, Western Australia
Sportswomen from Western Australia
Medallists at the 2022 Commonwealth Games